Burgess Hill railway station is on the Brighton Main Line, serving the town of Burgess Hill, West Sussex. Train services are provided by Southern and Thameslink.

History
The first station at Burgess Hill was opened on 21 September 1841 by the London and Brighton Railway (L&BR), at the time of the completion of the route to Brighton. The original facilities were all in the small wooden hut (which still stands as a refurbished waiting room on platform 1) and wooden platforms set beside the main line. The L&BR became the London Brighton and South Coast Railway (LB&SCR) in 1846 and a track plan of the station dating from 1874 shows that by then several sidings and a signal box had been constructed at the station.

The present station building dates from 1877 and is typical of LB&SCR stations of the period.

Layout and facilities
The station has a typical double-track layout, with two side platforms each long enough to hold a 12-car train. Both platforms are signalled bidirectionally, but in normal service platform 1 is used by northbound services towards London (and beyond to Bedford and Cambridge), while platform 2 is for southbound trains to Brighton and Littlehampton. Both platforms are covered by shelters approximately four carriages long at the north end, and there are also smaller shelters further down the platforms. There is a small café and an accessible toilet located on platform 1 and a small waiting room on platform 2.

The station has two car parks: the main one next to platform 1 and a smaller one adjacent to platform 2. Both car parks include disabled parking spaces.

There are three entrances/exits to and from the station, all featuring ticket barriers. The main entrance/exit is through the station building on Station Road, which includes the ticket office and also houses a small newsagent and a cash machine. Access to the platforms from the station building is via two sheltered sets of stairs, which also act as a footbridge between the two platforms. The other two entrances/exits link the platforms directly with the station's car parks. These entrances/exits are both fully wheelchair-accessible, but each one only connects directly to one of the platforms - access to the other platform is only via the aforementioned footbridge. This means that step-free access is available to both platforms, but step-free access between the two platforms is only possible by venturing outside the station. Ticket machines are located by each of the three entrances.

Refurbishments 
In November 2020, a £1.2 million refurbishment was carried out at Burgess Hill station. This introduced a new waiting room on the northbound platform 1, inside of the original 1841 building which was originally a parcels store. Another smaller waiting room was refurbished with new furniture on the southbound platform 2. Refurbishments were also carried out to the two 50 metre long platform canopies, replacing the original cast iron and timber structure with a more modern steel structure.

The surface of both platforms is also currently being repaved as of May 2021.

Services
Off-peak, services at Burgess Hill are operated by Southern and Thameslink using  and  EMUs.

The typical off-peak service in trains per hour is:
 2 tph to  via 
 2 tph to  via London Bridge 
 2 tph to 
 2 tph to  via 

During the peak hours and on Saturdays, the service between London Victoria and Littlehampton is increased to 2 tph. There are also a number of peak hour Thameslink services to  Littlehampton.

In addition, the station is served by a number of peak hour Gatwick Express services which usually pass through Burgess Hill.

Gallery

References

External links

Burgess Hill
Railway stations in West Sussex
DfT Category C2 stations
Former London, Brighton and South Coast Railway stations
Railway stations in Great Britain opened in 1841
Railway stations served by Govia Thameslink Railway